The Embassy of the Republic of Indonesia in Caracas is the diplomatic mission of the Republic of Indonesia to the Bolivarian Republic of Venezuela. The embassy is concurrently accredited to five other surrounding countries:

 
 
 
 
 

Diplomatic relations between Indonesia and Venezuela were established on 10 October 1959. In 1977, the Indonesian government opened the embassy in Caracas with Ferdy Salim as the first Indonesian ambassador to Venezuela. The current ambassador, Mochammad Luthfie Witto'eng, was appointed by President Joko Widodo on 25 February 2016.

See also 

 Indonesia–Venezuela relations
 List of diplomatic missions of Indonesia
 List of diplomatic missions in Venezuela

References 

Caracas
Indonesia